Metropolitan Region of Caracas (MRC) or Greater Caracas (GC) (RMC or Gran Caracas; GC) is the urban agglomeration comprising the Metropolitan District of Caracas and the adjacent 11 municipalities over Miranda and Vargas state in Venezuela. Thus, it does not constitute a single administrative unit. The conurbation spreads south, west, east and north of Caracas. It has a population of 5,243,301.

Geography

Metropolitan divisions

The Metropolitan Region of Caracas consists of five distinct metropolitan divisions/conurbations, subdividing the region into five divisions.

References

External links
 Alcaldía Mayor Metropolitana
 Estado Miranda
 Estado Vargas

Caracas
Geography of Capital District (Venezuela)
Geography of Miranda (state)
Geography of Vargas (state)
Metropolitan areas of Venezuela